The Private Eye was a science fiction mystery digital comic written by Brian K. Vaughan, drawn by Marcos Martín and colored by Muntsa Vicente. The first issue was published by Panel Syndicate in March 2013. In 2015, the series won an Eisner Award for Best Digital/Webcomic and the Harvey Award for Best Online Comics Work.

The series is set in 2076, a time after "the cloud has burst", revealing everyone's secrets. As a result, there is no more Internet, and people are excessively guarded about their identity, to the point of appearing only masked in public. The story followed an unlicensed journalist, a "paparazzo", who is involved in a mysterious plot.

The Private Eye, which lasted 10 issues, was self-published by its creators digitally through their website, Panel Syndicate, in DRM-free formats. Readers were allowed to determine how much they wanted to pay per issue. To date Panel Syndicate has published comics in English, Spanish, Catalan, Portuguese and French. The Private Eye and Panel Syndicate have received critical acclaim and media attention for its role as one of the first DRM-free, pay what you want comics. In December 2015, the series was published in hardcover by Image Comics.

References

External links
 Panel Syndicate website

2013 comics debuts
Eisner Award winners
Harvey Award winners
2010s webcomics
Fiction set in the 2070s
Neo-noir comics
Science fiction webcomics
Image Comics titles
Comics by Brian K. Vaughan
Self-published books

Comics set in Los Angeles